is a town located in Okhotsk Subprefecture, Hokkaido, Japan. As of September 30, 2016, the town has an estimated population of 2,757 and a population density of 3.6 persons per km². The total area is 766.89 km².

In the Ainu language, the Takinoue area is called Ponkamuikotan which roughly translates to "Village of the Small Gods." The name Takinoue, which literally means "Above the Waterfall," originates from the first Japanese settlers who founded the city upstream from a waterfall.

Takinoue is famous for its mint production and produces 95% of the mint available in Japan. Currently there is about 10 hectors (25 acres) of land dedicated to mint farming.

Takinoue Park is famous for Shibazakura or Pink Moss. The 10,000 m² park attracts thousands of visitors every year between May and June when the flowers are in full bloom.

Geography
Takinoue is surrounded on three sides by mountains. It shares the fourth side with Monbetsu City.
 Mountains: Mt. Wenshiri (1,142m / 0.71 mi); Mt. Kitami-Fuji (1,306m / 0.81 mi); Mt. Teshio (1,558m / 0.97 mi)
 Major Rivers: Shokotsu River; Sakuru River; Oshiraneppu River

Climate

History
 1918 - Takinoue Village splits from Shokotsu Village and becomes a second-class municipality under the Monbetsu District.
 1947 - Takinoue Village becomes Takinoue Town.
 The National Land Agency awards  Takinoue 2nd place in the nation for quality of farmed products.

Economy
Takinoue's key industries are forestry, dairy farming, and dry-crop farming.

Agriculture
 Okhotsk Hamanasu Agricultural Cooperative, Takinoue Branch

Banking institutions
 Kitami Credit Union, Takinoue Branch

Postal services
 Takinoue Post Office (Japan Postal Service Center distribution point)
 Nigorikawa Post Office
 Takinishi Post Office

Police
 Takinoue Police Department (a sub-station of Monbetsu Police Department)

Sister cities
Takinoue is twinned with Ochi Town in Kōchi Prefecture.

Education

High schools
 Hokkaido Takinoue High School

Junior high schools
 Takinoue Junior High School

Elementary schools
 Takinoue Elementary School
 Nigorikawa Elementary School
 Takinishi Elementary School- closed 2014
 Shiratori Elementary School- closed 2013

Transportation

Airports
 Monbetsu Airport
 Asahikawa Airport

Rail
Takinoue has no rail services.

Bus
 Hokumon Bus - Local routes run from Takinoue to Monbetsu
 Hokkaido Chuo Bus, JR Hokkaido Bus, and Dohoku Bus lines run from Takinoue to Asahikawa and Sapporo

Roads

National Highways 
 National Highway 273

Prefectural Highways 
 Hokkaidō Route 61 (Shibetsu - Takinoue)
 Hokkaidō Route 137 (Engaru - Takinoue)
 Hokkaidō Route 617 (Oshiraneppu - Nigorikawa)
 Hokkaidō Route 828 (Shiratori - Takinoue)
 Hokkaidō Route 932 (Kamishokotsu - Takinoue)
 Hokkaidō Route 996 (Kamishokotsu - Takinoue)

Sightseeing
 Ukushima Wetlands
 Karinosato Herb Garden
 Kinsenkyo Gorge Walking Path
 Takinoue Park (Shibazakura)
 Yoshokuen Botanical Garden

Festivals
 Shibazakura Festival (May - June)
 Summer Festival of Love (mid August)

Mascot

She is a sakura fairy. Using her sakura wand, she can grant anyone wishes. She is also known to make music. She is unveiled in 1991.

References

External links

Official Website 

Towns in Hokkaido